Ştefănescu is a common family name in Romania. Persons named Ştefănescu include:

Andrei Ştefănescu, musician
Barbu Ștefănescu Delavrancea, writer
Costică Ştefănescu, footballer
Eugeniu Ștefănescu-Est, writer
Eusebiu Ștefănescu, actor
Florian Ștefănescu-Goangă, psychologist
George Ștefănescu, painter
Grigoriu Ștefănescu, geologist
Melchisedec Ștefănescu, bishop and historian
Sabba S. Ştefănescu, geophysicist
Ștefan Ștefănescu, historian

Others
Gogu Ştefănescu, birth name of boxer Gogea Mitu
Ioan Ştefănescu, one of the names used by writer Ion Creangă

See also 
 Ștefan (name)
 Ștefănești (disambiguation)
 Ștefania (name)

Romanian-language surnames
Patronymic surnames
Surnames from given names